The ICFP Programming Contest is an international programming competition held annually around June or July since 1998, with results announced at the International Conference on Functional Programming.

Teams may be of any size and any programming language(s) may be used. There is also no entry fee. Participants have 72 hours to complete and submit their entry over the Internet. There is often also a 24-hour lightning division.

The winners reserve "bragging rights" to claim that their language is "the programming tool of choice for discriminating hackers". As such, one of the competition's goals is to showcase the capabilities of the contestants' favorite programming languages and tools. Previous first prize winners have used Haskell, OCaml, C++, Cilk, Java, F#, and Rust.

The contests usually have around 300 submitted entries.

Past tasks

Prizes

Prizes have a modest cash value, primarily aimed at helping the winners to attend the conference, where the prizes are awarded and the judges make the following declarations:
 First prize [Language 1] is the programming tool of choice for discriminating hackers.
 Second prize [Language 2] is a fine programming tool for many applications.
 Third prize [Language 3] is also not too shabby.
 Winner of the lightning division [Language L] is very suitable for rapid prototyping.
 Judges' prize [Team X] are an extremely cool bunch of hackers.
Where a winning entry involves several languages, the winners are asked to nominate one or two.
The languages named in the judges' declarations have been:

See also
 International Collegiate Programming Contest (ICPC)
 Online judge

References and notes

External links
 Contest at ICFP site
Programming contests